The XXIII Constitutional Government of Portugal is the current cabinet of the Portuguese government, the 23rd since the establishment of the current constitution. It was established on 30 March 2022 as a Socialist Party (PS) majority government led by Prime Minister António Costa.

The government is formed by 18 ministers and 41 secretaries of state.

Composition

References 

Constitutional Governments of Portugal
2022 establishments in Portugal
Cabinets established in 2022
António Costa
Current governments